James Ford may refer to:

Sportspeople
James Ford (American football) (born 1949), American football player
Jamie Ford (cricketer) (born 1976), English cricketer 
James Ford (cricketer, born 1836) (1836–1877), English cricketer
James Ford (footballer) (born 1981), English footballer for Bournemouth
James Ford (rugby league) (born 1982), English rugby league footballer
James Ford (soccer) (1889–?), American soccer player
Jimmy Ford (1912–1982), American Negro leagues baseball player

Characters
James Ford (One Life to Live), a fictional character from the ABC soap opera One Life to Live
James "Sawyer" Ford, a fictional character from the ABC program Lost

Others
James Ford (actor) (1903–1977), American actor in silent and sound films
James Ford (antiquary) (1779–1850), benefactor of the Ford Lectures at Oxford University
James Ford (musician) (born 1981), British producer and DJ; member of Simian Mobile Disco
James Ford (Pennsylvania politician) (1783–1859), U.S. Congressman
James Ford (pirate) (c. 1770–1833), American pirate and civic leader
James Ford (translator) (1797–1877), English cleric and Dante translator
James A. Ford (1911–1968), American archaeologist
James Hobart Ford (1829–1867), Union general during the American Civil War and Indian Wars
James Ishmael Ford (born 1948), American Zen Buddhist priest and Unitarian Universalist minister
James R. Ford (1925–2017), American educator, politician, businessman and community activist
James Robert Ford (born 1980), British web and installation artist
James W. Ford (1893–1957), African American politician and Communist vice presidential candidate
James Allan Ford (1920–2009), Scottish writer, soldier and civil servant
Jim Ford (actor) (born 1981), American actor, stuntman, screenwriter and film director
Jim Ford (1941–2007), American singer-songwriter

See also
Jamie Ford (born 1968), American author
John-James Ford (born 1972), writer
James Forde (born 1996), actor